The Genius of Ray Charles is a 1959 Ray Charles album, released in October by Atlantic Records, the seventh album since the debut Ray Charles in 1957. The album consists of swinging pop with big band arrangements. It comprises a first half of big band songs and a second half of string-backed ballads. The Genius of Ray Charles sold fewer than 500,000 copies and charted at number 17 on the Billboard 200. "Let the Good Times Roll" and "Don't Let the Sun Catch You Cryin'" were released as singles in 1959.

Composition 

The album showcased Charles' breakout from rhythm and blues and onto a broader musical stage. Atlantic Records gave him full support in production and arrangements. As originally presented, the A side of the album featured the Ray Charles band with David "Fathead" Newman supplemented by players from the Count Basie and Duke Ellington bands, and arrangements by Quincy Jones.

The B side of the original album consists of six ballads with arrangements by Ralph Burns and a large string orchestra.  Charles's performance of "Come Rain or Come Shine", a song identified with Frank Sinatra, brought public attention to his voice alone without the "distractions" of his soulful piano and his snappy band.

Each side contains a tribute to Louis Jordan with two songs he had hits with "Let the Good Times Roll" and "Don't Let the Sun Catch You Cryin'".

Critical reception 

In a contemporary review, Joe Goldberg of the American Record Guide panned the arrangements as "hopelessly banal and inadequate, saved only" by the piano playing of Charles, who "comes through beautifully", and felt that only the last three songs give the album "its importance". He called "Am I Blue?" the album's highlight and "almost unbearably poignant, with the same feeling of deep sensibility transcending limited vocal equipment that can be heard on Walter Huston's recording of 'September Song', or Adolph Green's of 'A Quiet Girl'."

In a retrospective review for AllMusic, music critic Scott Yanow wrote that "Charles' voice is heard throughout in peak form, giving soul to even the veteran standards." In a 1990 review of its CD reissue, Lloyd Sachs of the Chicago Sun-Times wrote that The Genius of Ray Charles is "one of the all-time great albums. But it is not, alas, one of all the all-time great CDs. The sound is extremely harsh, exaggerating the partially hidden flaws of the original ... Still, the glory of Charles' singing and the ace arrangements ... have a way of breaking down resistance." In 2000, Q magazine included The Genius of Ray Charles in their list of the "Best Soul Albums of All Time" and wrote that it "finds the great man swinging, emoting, cajoling and laughing his way through a selection of standards that he makes his own ... it exudes pure class."

It was voted number 390 in Colin Larkin's All Time Top 1000 Albums 3rd Edition (2000).
 
In 2003, Rolling Stone ranked The Genius of Ray Charles number 263 on their list of the 500 greatest albums of all time, and 265 in a 2012 revised list. In a 2004 review for the magazine, Robert Christgau praised producers Jerry Wexler and Nesuhi Ertegun for persuading "five different arrangers into the subtlest charts of Charles' career." Christgau asserted that "Charles tried many times, but except for Modern Sounds, he never again assembled such a consistent album in this mode." In The Rolling Stone Album Guide (2004), critics J. D. Considine and Michaelangelo Matos said that it is "perhaps the most important of [Charles'] albums for Atlantic", because it "introduces the musical approach he would follow for much of the '70s." They argued that, instead of pursuing the contemporary sounds of Frank Sinatra, Dean Martin, or swing era big bands, Charles played a "curious hybrid of the brassy R&B of his pop-oriented recordings and the showy shmaltz favored by the era's middle-of-the-road acts." However, they cautioned listeners that the album was "abysmally recorded, with frequent overmodulation muddying its brasher moments."

Track listing

Personnel

Side one
Ray Charles - vocals, piano
Clark Terry - trumpet
Ernie Royal - trumpet
Joe Newman - trumpet
Snooky Young - trumpet
Marcus Belgrave - trumpet
John Hunt - trumpet
Melba Liston - trombone
Quentin Jackson - trombone
Thomas Mitchell - trombone
Al Grey - trombone
Frank Wess - flute, alto saxophone and tenor saxophone
Marshal Royal - alto saxophone
Paul Gonsalves - tenor saxophone (and solo on "Two Years of Torture")
Zoot Sims - tenor saxophone (on "Let the Good Times Roll", "Alexander's Ragtime Band" and "'Deed I Do")
Billy Mitchell - tenor saxophone (on "It had to be You", "Two Years of Torture" and "When Your Lover Has Gone")
David "Fathead" Newman - tenor saxophone (and solos on "Let the Good Times Roll", "When Your Lover Has Gone", "'Deed I Do")
Quincy Jones – arranger, conductor on A1 and A6
Ernie Wilkins - arrangement on A2
Ralph Burns - arrangements on A3 and side 2
Johnny Acea - arrangement on A4
Al Cohn - arrangement on A5

Side two
Ray Charles - piano and vocals
Allen Hanlon - guitar 
Wendell Marshall - string bass 
Ted Sommer - drums 
Bob Brookmeyer - valve trombone
Harry Lookofsky - concertmaster 
Unidentified -  large woodwinds and strings section
Ralph Burns - arranger

Other credits
Nat Hentoff - sleeve notes
Bill Schwartau, Tom Dowd - recording engineer
Marvin Israel - cover design
Lee Friedlander - cover photography

References

Bibliography

External links 
 

1959 albums
Ray Charles albums
Atlantic Records albums
Albums arranged by Quincy Jones
Albums arranged by Ralph Burns
Albums produced by Nesuhi Ertegun
Albums produced by Jerry Wexler
Grammy Hall of Fame Award recipients
Grammy Award for Best Male Pop Vocal Performance
Albums conducted by Quincy Jones
Albums arranged by Ernie Wilkins
Albums arranged by Al Cohn